Michael Anthony Santoro is a business ethicist and professor in the Department of Management and Entrepreneurship at the Leavey School of Business, Santa Clara University. Santoro has written and offered public comments on business and human rights, corporate social responsibility and human rights in China, pharmaceutical industry ethics, and Wall Street ethics.  He was previously professor at Rutgers Business School.

Early life and education
Santoro was born on December 10, 1954 in Montreal, Quebec, Canada. Santoro graduated from Xaverian High School in Brooklyn, NY.  He received his Ph.D. degree from Harvard University, his J.D. from New York University, and his A.B. from Oberlin College.  He was a Fulbright fellow at the University of Hong Kong.

Career

Business and human rights
Santoro is the president and co-founder of the Global Business and Human Rights Scholars Association, as well as the Co-Editor-In-Chief of the Business and Human Rights Journal published by Cambridge University Press. He is also a member of the editorial boards of the Journal of Human Rights and Business Ethics Quarterly. Santoro has described the business and human rights field as "both a multidisciplinary  (and sometimes interdisciplinary) academic field drawing from, inter alia, business ethics, law and the social sciences, and a social, economic and political justice movement involving governments and intergovernmental institutions, as well as indigenous people, nongovernmental organizations, and other civil society actors."

China, human rights, and Western business

"Fair Share" Theory of Business Responsibility for Human Rights
Santoro's first book Profits and Principles: Global Capitalism and Human Rights in China (Cornell University Press, 2000) outlines a "fair share" theory of business responsibility for human rights. Reviewer Lucien Pye wrote that "this timely study, which combines sharp moral reasoning, spells out what can and cannot be expected --and what American multinational corporations should and should not be doing in China." The New York Times Book Review said Santoro's "solidly grounded analysis deserves a wide audience."

Testimony Before the United States Senate Finance Committee
On March 23, 2000, Michael Santoro testified before the United States Finance Committee in favor of China's accession into the WTO. Based on his research in Profits and Principles, Santoro argued at the time that, rather than continuing to threaten trade sanctions, granting Permanent Normal Trade Relations (PNTR) to China was the best strategy for Western nations to promote human rights in China.  In his testimony, Santoro introduced the concept of positive "human rights spinoff"  into the PNTR debate. To succeed in China, Santoro argued, "companies must employ state--of-the-art technology and management practices.  In doing things that a company must do to build market share, multinational corporations are transmitting values and practices to their employees that have tremendous significance for democracy and human rights."

China 2020
In China 2020: How Western Business Can--and Should--Influence Social and Political Change in the Coming Decade (Cornell University Press, 2009) Santoro presents a more sanguine view of the human rights impacts of foreign business, observing that foreign companies operating in China had fallen into a "complacent partnership" with the Chinese government that was blunting the potential positive human rights impacts of foreign business and private enterprise in China. Santoro argues that "foreign investment in China will never be secure unless it is embedded in a society where rights, including economic rights, are respected...and where a strong and independent rule of law protects the rights and economic interests of its citizens," calling it "unacceptable that no major business has initiated a court action against any level of Chinese government for anything."

Pharmaceutical industry ethics
In 2005 Santoro and Johnson & Johnson executive Thomas M. Gorrie published a co-edited volume Ethics and The Pharmaceutical Industry (Cambridge University Press, 2005).  In an introductory chapter, Santoro describes "the unravelling of the "grand bargain" between the pharmaceutical industry and society.  This grand bargain was a complex, implicit social contract that allowed the modern global pharmaceutical industry to emerge in the second half of the twentieth century.  Although the industry prospered immensely, society also enjoyed a  bountiful array of life-saving and-life enhancing drugs.  As the twenty-first century begins, however, this grand bargain is in tatters and public mistrust and resentment of the industry run feverishly high."

In 2009, Michael Santoro was hired in the settlement of a shareholder derivative lawsuit against the drug company Merck during the Vioxx controversy to help draft corporate governance reforms that presiding judge Carol E. Higbee said would "be helpful to the shareholders because they will prevent potential future liability from the sale of potentially dangerous drugs."

During the health concern scare over Yaz and Yasmin, Santoro told the NY Times that pharmaceutical companies should "set higher standards for themselves than those set by the F.D.A.". When de-regulation of consumer safeguards in the pharmaceutical industry was proposed in early 2017 by the Trump administration, Santoro argued against the ability of companies to market off-label drugs directly to the public, saying, "Drug companies have a very bad history of promoting products for which they haven't been approved. The industry hasn't displayed trustworthiness as far as this goes." During a 2017 CNN investigation of inappropriate use of drugs in nursing homes and the pharmaceutical companies who push these drugs through sales departments, Santoro agreed with the investigation and accused the salespeople of "actually participating in the prescribing decision."

Wall Street ethics and the financial crisis
In 2013, Santoro and his co-author Ronald J. Strauss published Wall Street Values : Business Ethics and the Global Financial Crisis (Cambridge University Press, 2013). Santoro and Strauss argue that  Wall Street's "ethical problems came when proprietary trading began to overshadow customer services."

During the 2013 Bloomberg customer privacy scandal where its journalists were provided access to private company information through its network terminals, Santoro made reference to the conflict of interests on Wall Street and deemed it "a major breach of customer trust." In 2016, Santoro claimed that the Federal Reserve has become politicized and that "in the last financial crisis we had to worry about the impact of on government from the bursting of the business bubble.  In the next crisis we will have to worry about the impact on business from the bursting of the government debt bubble".

Publications

Books
Santoro's published books include:

Personal life

Santoro is married to Robyn Burch, a registered nurse.  They live in Santa Clara, California with their twin boys Jack Welton Santoro and Gaetano Orazio Santoro II who were born in 2016.

References

External links 
Michael Santoro (Website)
Michael Santoro - Santa Clara University

1954 births
Living people
Oberlin College alumni
New York University School of Law alumni
Harvard University alumni
Santa Clara University faculty
Rutgers University–Newark faculty